Adolfus africanus, also known as the multi-scaled forest lizard or green-bellied forest lizard, is a species of lizard. It has a disjunct distribution in the Central African humid forest zone and is found in Cameroon, the Central African Republic, the Democratic Republic of the Congo, South Sudan, Uganda, Rwanda, western Kenya, and extreme northern Zambia; it seems to be absent from the central Congo Basin. It is associated with primary forests and probably does not tolerate deforestation.

References

Adolfus
Reptiles described in 1906
Taxa named by George Albert Boulenger
Lacertid lizards of Africa
Reptiles of Cameroon
Reptiles of the Central African Republic
Reptiles of the Democratic Republic of the Congo
Reptiles of Kenya
Reptiles of South Sudan
Vertebrates of Rwanda
Reptiles of Uganda
Reptiles of Zambia